The Field hockey competition at the Central American and Caribbean Games is an international field hockey event organized by the Central American and Caribbean Sports Organization (CACSO) as part of the Central American and Caribbean Games. The men's competition was introduced in 1982, and women's field hockey competition was first organized during the 1986 games. The winning teams qualify for the next Pan American Games.

Men's tournament

Results

Summary

* = hosts

Team appearances

Women's tournament

Results

Summary

* = hosts

Team appearances

Medal table

Total

Men

Women

References

External links 
 Official site CASCO 

 
Central American and Caribbean Games
Sports at the Central American and Caribbean Games
Central American And Caribbean Games